The 1891 New South Wales election was for 141 members representing 74 electoral districts. The election was conducted on the basis of a simple majority or first-past-the-post voting system. In this election there were 39 multi-member districts returning 106 members. In these multi-member districts each elector could vote for as many candidates as there were vacancies. 7 of the 35 single member districts were uncontested. The average number of enrolled voters per seat was 2,166, ranging from Wilcannia (1,023) to Sturt (8,306). Sturt was an anomaly, as enrolments had increased by 5,376 since the 1889 election, and the next largest electorate was Canterbury (4,676).

Election results

Albury

Argyle

|  |  
	| colspan="2"   |  hold 2
	| colspan="3" style="text-align:center;" |

Balmain

|  | 
	| colspan="2"   |  gain 4 from 
	| colspan="3" style="text-align:center;" |

Balranald

|  | 
	| colspan="2"   |  gain 1 from 
	| rowspan="2" colspan="3" style="text-align:center;" | 
|-
|  | 
	| colspan="2"   |  hold 1

Bathurst

The Bogan

|  | 
	| colspan="2"   |  gain 1 from 
	| rowspan="3" colspan="3" style="text-align:center;" | 
|-
|  | 
	| colspan="2"   |  hold 1
|-
|  | 
	| colspan="2"   |  hold 1
|-

One of the sitting members, William Alison, did not contest the election.

Boorowa

Bourke

|  | 
	| colspan="2"   |  gain 1 from 
	| rowspan="2" colspan="3" style="text-align:center;" | 
|-
|  | 
	| colspan="2"   |  hold 2
|-

Braidwood

Camden

|  | 
	| colspan="2"   |  hold 2
	| rowspan="2" colspan="3" style="text-align:center;" | 
|-
|  | 
	| colspan="2"   |  hold 1
|-

Canterbury

|  | 
	| colspan="2"   |  gain 2 from 
	| rowspan="2" colspan="3" style="text-align:center;" | 
|-
|  | 
	| colspan="2"   |  hold 2

The Elections and Qualifications Committee conducted a re-count in September 1891 which overturned the election of John Wheeler and declared that James Eve had been elected.

Carcoar

|  | 
	| colspan="2"   |  gain 1 from 
	| rowspan="2" colspan="3" style="text-align:center;" | 
|-
|  | 
	| colspan="2"   |  hold 1

The Clarence

Central Cumberland

|  |  
	| colspan="2"   |  hold 4
	| colspan="3" style="text-align:center;" |  
|-

Durham

East Macquarie

|  |  
	| colspan="2"   |  hold 2
	| colspan="3" style="text-align:center;" |

East Maitland

East Sydney

|  | 
	| colspan="2"   |  hold 2
	| rowspan="3" colspan="3" style="text-align:center;" | 
|-
|  | 
	| colspan="2"   |  hold 1
|-
|  | 

Walter Bradley won a seat at the 1891 East Sydney by-election and Edmund Barton held it at this election. George Reid whilst a Free Trader, did not support the Free Trade government of Sir Henry Parkes.

Eden

|  | 
	| colspan="2"   |  hold 2
	| colspan="3" style="text-align:center;" |

Forbes

|  | 
	| colspan="3" style="text-align:center;" |

The Glebe

|  | 
	| colspan="2"   |  hold 1
	| rowspan="2" colspan="3" style="text-align:center;" | 
|-
|  | 
	| colspan="2"   |  gain 1 from

Glen Innes

|  | 
	| colspan="2"   |  hold 2
	| colspan="3" style="text-align:center;" |

Gloucester

The sitting member, Jonathan Seaver, unsuccessfully contested St Leonards because of his opposition to the leadership of Sir Henry Parkes.

Goulburn

Grafton

Grenfell

Gundagai

Gunnedah

The Gwydir

Hartley

|  | 
	| colspan="2"   |  win 1
	| rowspan="2" colspan="3" style="text-align:center;" | (1 new seat)
|-
|  | 
	| colspan="2"   |  hold 1

The Hastings and Manning

|  | 
	| colspan="2"   |  hold 1
	| rowspan="2" colspan="3" style="text-align:center;" |  
|-
|  | 
	| colspan="2"   |  gain 1 from

The Hawkesbury

The Hume

|  |  
	| colspan="2"   |  hold 2
	| colspan="3" style="text-align:center;" |  
|-

The Hunter

Illawarra

|  | 
	| colspan="2"   |  gain 1 from 
	| rowspan="2" colspan="3" style="text-align:center;" | 
|-
|  | 
	| colspan="2"   |  gain 1 from

Inverell

Kiama

The Macleay

|  | 
	| colspan="2"   |  hold 1
	| rowspan="2" colspan="3" style="text-align:center;" | 
|-
|  | 

Otho Dangar whilst a Protectionist, supported the Free Trade government of Sir Henry Parkes.

Molong

Monaro

|  | 
	| colspan="2"   |  hold 2
	| colspan="3" style="text-align:center;" |

Morpeth

Mudgee

|  | 
	| rowspan="3" colspan="3" style="text-align:center;" | 
|-
|  | 
	| colspan="2"   |  hold 1
|-
|  | 
	| colspan="2"   |  gain 1 from 

John Haynes and Robert Jones whilst Free Traders, did not support the Free Trade government of Sir Henry Parkes.

The Murray

|  | 
	| colspan="2"   |  hold 2
	| colspan="3" style="text-align:center;" |

The Murrumbidgee

|  | 
	| colspan="2"   |  hold 2
	| rowspan="2" colspan="3" style="text-align:center;" |  
|-
|  | 
	| colspan="2"   |  gain 1 from

The Namoi

|  | 
	| colspan="2"   |  win 1
	| rowspan="2" colspan="3" style="text-align:center;" | (1 new seat)
|-
|  | 
	| colspan="2"   |  hold 1

The Nepean

Newcastle

|  | 
	| colspan="2"   |  gain 2 from 
	| rowspan="2" colspan="3" style="text-align:center;" | 
|-
|  | 
	| colspan="2"   |  hold 1

James Curley had won a seat from William Grahame at the 1889 by-election. William Grahame regained a seat at the 1891 by-election following the death of James Fletcher.

New England

|  | 
	| colspan="2"   |  hold 1, win 1
	| rowspan="2" colspan="3" style="text-align:center;" | (1 new seat)
|-
|  | 
	| colspan="2"   |  hold 1

Newtown

|  | 
	| colspan="2"   |  win 1, gain 1 from 
	| rowspan="2" colspan="3" style="text-align:center;" | (1 new seat)
|-
|  | 
	| colspan="2"   |  hold 2

Northumberland

|  | 
	| colspan="2"   |  hold 2
	| rowspan="2" colspan="3" style="text-align:center;" | 
|-
|  | 
	| colspan="2"   |  gain 1 from

Orange

|  | 
	| colspan="2"   |  gain 1 from 
	| rowspan="2" colspan="3" style="text-align:center;" | 
|-
|  | 
	| colspan="2"   |  hold 1

Paddington

|  | 
	| colspan="2"   |  hold 3
	| rowspan="2" colspan="3" style="text-align:center;" | 
|-
|  | 

Jack Want whilst a Free Trader, did not support the Free Trade government of Sir Henry Parkes.

Parramatta

Patrick's Plains

Queanbeyan

Redfern

|  | 
	| colspan="2"   |  hold 2
	| rowspan="2" colspan="3" style="text-align:center;" | 
|-
|  | 
	| colspan="2"   |  gain 2 from 

William Schey (Protectionist) won a seat at a by-election in 1889 and retained it at this election.

The Richmond

|  | 
	| colspan="3" style="text-align:center;" | 

Thomas Ewing, Bruce Nicoll and John Perry whilst Protectionists, supported the Free Trade government of Sir Henry Parkes.

Shoalhaven

St Leonards

|  | 
	| colspan="2"   |  hold 2
	| rowspan="2" colspan="3" style="text-align:center;" | 
|-
|  | 
	| colspan="2"   |  gain 1 from 

Jonathan Seaver was the member for Gloucester, a staunch free trader who contested St Leonards because of his opposition to the leadership of Sir Henry Parkes.

South Sydney

|  | 
	| colspan="2"   |  hold 2
	| rowspan="2" colspan="3" style="text-align:center;" | 
|-
|  | 
	| colspan="2"   |  hold 1, gain 1 from

Sturt

The sitting member for Sturt, Wyman Brown (Protectionist), did not contest the election.

Tamworth

|  | 
	| colspan="2"   |  hold 2
	| colspan="3" style="text-align:center;" |

Tenterfield

Tumut

The Upper Hunter

|  | 
	| colspan="2"   |  gain 1 from 
	| rowspan="2" colspan="3" style="text-align:center;" | 
|-
|  | 
	| colspan="2"   |  hold 1

Wellington

Wentworth

[[Joseph Palmer Abbott|Joseph Abbott]] had been elected as a Protectionist however on his appointment as Speaker in 1890 he was listed as an independent.

West Macquarie

West Maitland

West Sydney

|  | 
	| colspan="3" style="text-align:center;" | 

Adolphus Taylor did not contest the election.

Wilcannia

Wollombi

Yass Plains

Young

|  | 
	| colspan="3" style="text-align:center;" |

See also 

 Candidates of the 1891 New South Wales colonial election
 Members of the New South Wales Legislative Assembly, 1891–1894

References 

1891